The 1994 Skol World Darts Championship was held following 18 months of controversy within the sport of darts. After the 1993 Embassy World Championships, several players decided it was time to part company with the British Darts Organisation (who had always organised the World Championship) and form their own organisation. The new organisation was known as the World Darts Council (WDC). The WDC would later become the Professional Darts Corporation (PDC).

The WDC decided to introduce their own separate World Championship, with the inaugural tournament being staged before the BDO version. The 1994 Championship started on Boxing Day 1993, and finished on 2 January 1994. This started a tradition for the WDC/PDC World Championship to kick off before the new calendar year begins. The tournament was staged at the Circus Tavern, Purfleet, Essex.

Dennis Priestley became the first WDC World Darts Champion, winning the final 6–1 against Phil Taylor to add to his 6–0 whitewash victory over Eric Bristow in the 1991 World Championship. 1994 was the last time that Phil Taylor would fail to win the World Championship until 2003.

The 16 defectors
Originally 16 players "defected" from the BDO to form the WDC/PDC – Phil Taylor, Dennis Priestley, Rod Harrington, Alan Warriner, Peter Evison, Richie Gardner, Jocky Wilson, Eric Bristow, Keith Deller, John Lowe, Bob Anderson, Cliff Lazarenko, Kevin Spiolek, Jamie Harvey, Mike Gregory and Chris Johns.

However, Johns and Gregory returned to the BDO without ever competing at the PDC World Championship. They were replaced with Graeme Stoddart and Kevin Burrows and the field was brought up to 24 by adding eight players who are Larry Butler, Sean Downs, Gerald Verrier, Jerry Umberger, Jim Watkins, Dave Kelly and Steve Brown from North America and Tom Kirby of Ireland.

Tournament and format
There were 24 players involved and the tournament featured an unusual round-robin format. The players were put into groups of three where the order of play was thus: 
Player A v player B
Loser of match 1 v player C
Winner of match 1 v player C
This was done so that there would usually always be something to play for in the last group game.

The group winner would progress to the quarter-finals (best of seven sets) and the tournament then became a straight knock-out event. The semi-finals were the best of 9 sets and the final was best of 11 sets.

Seeds
 Dennis Priestley
 Alan Warriner
 Bob Anderson
 Peter Evison
 Rod Harrington
 Phil Taylor
 Kevin Spiolek
 John Lowe

Prize money
The prize money for the tournament was £64,000 – significantly less than the 1994 BDO World Championship which featured a £136,100 prize fund.

Tournament review

Group stage
The majority of the major players came through the group stage without trouble. Phil Taylor eased past Jamie Harvey 3–1, and Jim Watkins 3–0 to win Group 1, while 1988 World Champion, Bob Anderson, cruised into the quarter-finals for a showdown against Taylor, after a series of 3–0 wins against Americans Gerald Verrier and Dave Kelly. But there was room for an American to upset the odds, as Steve Brown, surprisingly, took Group 3, with wins against 1983 champion Keith Deller and Kevin Spiolek. Alan Warriner would go through to meet him after a couple of 3–1 wins against Richie Gardner and Cliff Lazarenko. Peter Evison showed no signs of discomfort, with consecutive 3–0 wins over Jerry Umberger and Kevin Burrows, and two 90-plus averages to go with it; the second of which, 97.56, would be the highest three-dart average in the tournament. Rod Harrington also went through after winning group 6, though not without difficulty.  After a 3–1 win over five time World Champion, Eric Bristow, he narrowly defeated Sean Downs by 3 sets to 2 to go through to the last 8. Group 7 would see three-time champion John Lowe bow out, who narrowed missed out in a tight group, which saw Tom Kirby from Ireland book a quarter-final place, despite suffering defeat in his opening match to Lowe. A 3–1 win over American Larry Butler, and Lowe's 3–2 loss to Butler, ensured the Irishmen's advancement.  He would be up against Dennis Priestley, after the Yorkshireman saw off Jocky Wilson 3–2 and Graeme Stoddart 3–0 to book a quarter-final place.

Quarter-finals
In a battle of two former world champions, Phil Taylor defeated Bob Anderson 4–2. Steve Brown upset the odds again to defeat 1993 runner-up Alan Warriner 4–3 and book a meeting with Taylor in the semi-finals. Peter Evison continued his good form, recording another 90-plus three-dart average while beating Rod Harrington 4–1, while Dennis Priestley ended the run of Tom Kirby with a 4–2 win.

Semi-finals and third-place play-off
Brown's dream run finally ended in the semi-finals, as Taylor beat him 5–0 to reach his third world final. The scoreline seemed harsh on Brown, however, as both players finished with the same three-dart average (91.20). In the other semi-final, Priestley beat Evison 5–3, thus reaching his second world final. Brown capped off his impressive run in fine style, beating Evison 5–1 in the third-place play-off.

Final
The final turned out to be a one-sided affair, with Taylor rarely giving Priestley any trouble at all. Priestley raced into a 5–0 lead, and eventually won 6–1 to take his second world title.

Results

Group stage

Group A

26 December

27 December

28 December

Group B

26 December

27 December

28 December

Group C

26 December

27 December

28 December

Group D

26 December

27 December

28 December

Group E

26 December

27 December

28 December

Group F

26 December

27 December

28 December

Group G

26 December

27 December

28 December

Group H

26 December

27 December

28 December

Knockout stages

Third-place play-off:  (4) Peter Evison 84.48 1 – 5  Steve Brown 89.04

Representation from different countries
This table shows the number of players by country in the 1st WDC World Championship.

References

PDC World Darts Championships
WDC World Darts Championship
WDC World Darts Championship
WDC World Darts Championship
WDC World Darts Championship
Purfleet
Sport in Essex